Burke (also Burke Station) is an unincorporated community in the town of Burke, Dane County, Wisconsin, United States.

The community was named for Irish statesman Edmund Burke, as most of its first residents were Irish.

Notes

Unincorporated communities in Dane County, Wisconsin
Unincorporated communities in Wisconsin